Valenzano is a town and comune in the Metropolitan City of Bari, in Apulia, Italy. It is home to several centers of scientific research, including Tecnopolis, one of the biggest of the Southern Italy in addition to The Mediterranean Agronomic Institute of Bari (IAMB) part of the International Centre for Advanced Mediterranean Agronomic Studies (CIHEAM). 
Valenzano is the seat of the "Antonio de Viti de Marco" Technical, Economic and Technological Institute (among which the Environmental Biotechnology specialization, established in the 2014-15 school year, stands out).

Sights include  the All Saints' Church, a former 11th century abbey, and the late Renaissance church of St Roch. The baronial castle was reconstructed in 1870.

History
According to medieval historian Bonaventura da Lama, Valenzano was founded by a Greek man, named Valentinian or Valentian, who arrived in Apulia in the 8th-9th century escaping an invasion of Saracens. Historically, the area was inhabited in prehistoric and early historic times (up to 4th century BC) by the Peucetii, of Illyrian origins, as testified by funerary findings.

References

External links
Official website

Cities and towns in Apulia